Elizabeth Lee "Lisa" Branch (born March 30, 1968) is a United States circuit judge of the United States Court of Appeals for the Eleventh Circuit. She is a former judge of the Georgia Court of Appeals.

Biography 
Branch was born in Atlanta, Georgia, in 1968 and was raised in Fulton County. She earned her Bachelor of Arts from Davidson College, cum laude, and her Juris Doctor, with distinction, from the Emory University School of Law, where she was inducted into the Order of the Coif and served as a notes and comments editor of the Emory Law Journal.

She began her legal career by serving for two years as a law clerk to Judge J. Owen Forrester of the United States District Court for the Northern District of Georgia. From 2004 to 2008, Branch served as a senior official in the administration of President George W. Bush. During this period, she served for three years as the Counselor to the Administrator of the Office of Information and Regulatory Affairs at the U. S. Office of Management and Budget, and for one year as the Associate General Counsel for Rules and Legislation at the United States Department of Homeland Security. Prior to ascending to the bench, Branch was a partner in the commercial litigation practice group at Smith, Gambrell & Russell, LLP in Atlanta, where she began her legal career in 1996.

She served as a judge of the Georgia Court of Appeals from 2012, when she was appointed by Governor of Georgia Nathan Deal to succeed Charles Mikell, to 2018 when she was appointed to the federal bench.

Federal judicial service 

On September 7, 2017, President Donald Trump nominated Branch to serve as a United States Circuit Judge of the United States Court of Appeals for the Eleventh Circuit, to the seat soon vacated by Judge Frank M. Hull, who will assume senior status on December 31, 2017. On December 13, 2017, a hearing on her nomination was held before the Senate Judiciary Committee.

On January 3, 2018, her nomination was returned to the President under Rule XXXI, Paragraph 6 of the United States Senate. On January 5, 2018, Trump announced his intent to renominate Branch to a federal judgeship. On January 8, 2018, her renomination was sent to the Senate. On January 18, 2018, her nomination was reported out of committee by a 19–2 vote. On February 26, the Senate invoked cloture by a 72–22 vote. The next day her nomination was confirmed by a 73–23 vote. She received her commission on March 19, 2018.

On September 29, 2022, United States Court of Appeals for the Fifth Circuit James C. Ho delivered a speech at a Federalist Society conference in Kentucky and said he would no longer hire law clerks from Yale Law School, which he said was plagued by "cancel culture" and students disrupting conservative speakers. Ho said Yale "not only tolerates the cancellation of views — it actively practices it.", and he urged other judges to likewise boycott the school. Judge Branch confirmed her participation in the Yale boycott in a statement to National Review. Branch told the National Review that Ho raised "legitimate concerns about the lack of free speech on law school campuses, Yale in particular," and that she would not consider students from Yale for clerkships in the future.

Notable cases

In 2020, she dissented in NAACP v. Alabama, arguing that Congress did not clearly and unambiguously abrogate states’ sovereign immunity from suit under the Voting Rights Act, and that plaintiffs were thus barred by sovereign immunity from suing states under § 2 of the Act.

Memberships and awards 

Branch was appointed by Governor Nathan Deal in 2013 to the Georgia Commission on Child Support. She is a member of the board of advisors of the Atlanta Lawyers Chapter for the Federalist Society. She is serving on the Emory University board of visitors through 2018. She is a member of the State Bar of Georgia's Appellate Practice Section and is a Master in the Lamar American Inn of Court and the Bleckley American Inn of Court. Branch is a former co-chair of the Homeland Security and National Defense Committee of the Section of Administrative Law and Regulatory Practice of the American Bar Association. She was selected for inclusion in Georgia Super Lawyers in 2012.

Electoral history 
2014

References

External links 

|-

1968 births
Living people
20th-century American lawyers
21st-century American lawyers
21st-century American judges
Davidson College alumni
Emory University School of Law alumni
Federalist Society members
Georgia Court of Appeals judges
Georgia (U.S. state) lawyers
Judges of the United States Court of Appeals for the Eleventh Circuit
People from Fulton County, Georgia
United States court of appeals judges appointed by Donald Trump
20th-century American women lawyers
21st-century American women lawyers
21st-century American women judges